Yeoh Soon Hin is a Malaysian politician and currently serves as Penang State Executive Councillor.

Yeoh Soon Hin is a Malaysian politician and the current Minister of Tourism, Arts and Culture of Penang State Executive Councillor. He was appointed to the position in March 2020 following a cabinet reshuffle by the Penang Chief Minister Chow Kon Yeow. Prior to his appointment as minister, Yeoh Soon Hin served as a state assemblyman for the Pulau Tikus constituency in Penang. He is a member of the Democratic Action Party (DAP), a major political party in Malaysia, and has been actively involved in politics since 2008.

Election results

References 

Democratic Action Party (Malaysia) politicians
21st-century Malaysian politicians
Members of the Penang State Legislative Assembly
Penang state executive councillors
Living people
People from Penang
Malaysian people of Chinese descent
1976 births